Kozice is a village in the municipality of Stolac in Bosnia and Herzegovina. According to the 1991 census the village had a population of 126 people.

History
On June 26/27, 1941, Ustaše drove away 130 Serbs of the families of Šakota, Šotra, Ćorluka and Krulj from the villages of Trijebanj and Kozice. 110 of these were killed, at Domanoviće, Bivolja Brda, Pileti and near Kukauš, and those who escaped death were those listed in a proclamation of general Lakse. 70 more locals were killed by the Ustaše on June 29/30.

Demographics

1991
According to the 1991 census the village had a population of 126 people.
120 Serbs (95.24%)
5 Croats (3.97%)
1 others (0.79%)

According to the 2013 census, its population was 145.

People
Zdravko Šotra (born 1933), Serbian and former Yugoslav film and television director

References

External links
Kozice – selo na dubravskoj visoravni

Populated places in Stolac
Villages in the Federation of Bosnia and Herzegovina